Fleet is a hamlet near Stoke on Hayling Island in Hampshire, England. The hamlet lies approximately 5.1 miles (8.2 km) east from Portsmouth and 1.6 miles (2.6 km) north from South Hayling.

Villages in Hampshire
Populated coastal places in Hampshire
Hayling Island